Michael Garvey (born July 27, 1988) is a former American rugby league footballer for the Philadelphia Fight in the USA Rugby League. He represented his country in the 2013 World Cup.

Playing career
Garvey has played for the Ipswich Jets in the Queensland Cup, Aston Bulls in the AMNRL and previously played rugby union for Hawaii Pacific University where he was awarded the 2010 Hawaii Rugby Football Union MVP Award, and rugby league for the Aston Bulls where he was awarded the 2011 AMNRL Rookie of the Year Award  as well as the 2012 USA International Player of the Year.

In 2013, Garvey was named in the United States squad for the World Cup and scored a try in their 22-18 trial win over France. His position is Centre.

References

1988 births
American rugby league players
United States national rugby league team players
Philadelphia Fight players
Ipswich Jets players
Rugby league wingers
Rugby league centres
Living people